"Ditanyè" (usually written ""), also known as "" ("The Anthem of Victory", ;) or "" ("One Single Night"), is the national anthem of Burkina Faso. Former president Thomas Sankara, also a jazz guitarist, wrote the lyrics. The composer of the melody is unknown, but it has also been attributed to Sankara.

It was adopted during his presidency in a decree issued on 2 August 1984, effective midnight on 4 August 1984, the first anniversary of Sankara's accession to the presidency. The decree also renamed the country from Upper Volta to its current name. The anthem replaced the "Hymne National Voltaïque", the national anthem of Upper Volta.

Lyrics 
Verses two and three and the second chorus are little known and rarely performed.

References

External links
Burkina Faso: Une Seule Nuit - Audio of the national anthem of Burkina Faso, with information and lyrics (archive link)

National symbols of Burkina Faso
National anthems
Burkinabé music
African anthems
1984 songs
National anthem compositions in F major
National anthem compositions in F-sharp major